The Prizren Podgor (or Prizren Podgur) is a geographical region in Kosovo, stretching from the branches of the Šar Mountains, from Prizren to the village of Dulje on the Crnoljeva mountain. It includes the eastern and northeastern part of the Prizren basin (Prizrenska kotlina) and presents its border region towards the Šar župe of Sirinićka župa and Sredačka župa. It is a sub-region of Metohija.  It includes the villages of Skorobišta, Dojnica, Grnčare, Novo Selo, Vrbičane, and the urban settlements of Kurilo and Baždarana, and suburb Ljubižda, of Prizren. It is inhabited by Albanians, Bosniaks, and Serbs.

Geography
The region is stretching from the branches of the Šar Mountains, from Prizren to the village of Dulje on the Crnoljeva mountain. It includes the eastern and northeastern part of the Prizren basin (Prizrenska kotlina) and presents its border region towards the Šar župe of Sirinićka župa and Sredačka župa. It is a sub-region of Metohija.

It includes the villages of Skorobišta, Dojnica, Grnčare, Novo Selo, Vrbičane, and the urban settlements of Kurilo and Baždarana, and suburb Ljubižda, of Prizren.

History
In the Middle Ages, it was a župa (county) named Podgor. The Ottomans called the region Havazi.

Culture
It is culturally connected to Serb-inhabited Sirinićka župa. The locals speak the Podgor speech (Podgorski govor) of the Serbian language; the speech of Skorobište, Grnčare and Novo Selo show Serbian–Macedonian linguistical contact.

References

Sources

Geographical regions of Kosovo
Subdivisions of Serbia in the Middle Ages